Karpovo is a rural locality (a village) in Malyshevskoye Rural Settlement, Selivanovsky District, Vladimir Oblast, Russia. The population was 55 as of 2010.

Geography 
Karpovo is located 36 km southwest of Krasnaya Gorbatka (the district's administrative centre) by road. Nikolo-Ushna is the nearest rural locality.

References 

Rural localities in Selivanovsky District